Karel Paukert (pronounced Karl Poukert) (January 1, 1935 in Skuteč in the Czech Republic) is a Czech-American organist, choir director and educator.

He graduated from the Prague Conservatory, and the Ghent Conservatory, Belgium. He studied under organists Jan Bedrich Krajs and Gabriel Verschraegen. Paukert immigrated to the United States in the 1960s and gained citizenship in 1972.

He taught at several universities, most notably as Professor of Organ and Church Music at Northwestern University and the Cleveland Institute of Music and became curator of the music department at the Cleveland Museum of Art in Cleveland, Ohio. During his tenure at Northwestern in the 1960s and 70's, Paukert was Organist Choirmaster of Saint Luke's Episcopal Church in Evanston, Illinois, and conducted the famed men and boys choir of the church. He founded Bach Week, the annual music festival dedicated to the music of Bach and his contemporaries that has featured leading international performers to this day. He has made recordings for Azica Records.

Paukert is currently organist and choirmaster at St. Paul's  Episcopal Church in Cleveland Heights, Ohio, and is curator Emeritus of the music department of the Cleveland Museum of Art.

Sources
 St. Paul's Church, Cleveland, Staff List
 Cleveland Artist Award 1995  http://clevelandartsprize.org/awardees/Karel_Paukert.html
 Concert in Prague

American classical organists
American male organists
Czech organists
Living people
1935 births
Cleveland Institute of Music faculty
21st-century organists
21st-century American male musicians
21st-century American keyboardists
Male classical organists